Pass It Around is the debut studio album by British rock band Smokey (later renamed Smokie), released in 1975.

The album features eleven original group songs and two Nicky Chinn / Mike Chapman compositions. The Chinn / Chapman written title track was chosen to be Smokie's debut single. "Pass It Around" / "Couldn't Live" was released on 21 March 1975 but failed to make the BBC Radio 1 playlist. The problem was playlist controllers who thought that the ambiguous lyrics might be seen as a reference to smoking marijuana. As a result, the single failed to reach the UK Top 50.

In order to promote Pass It Around, Smokie extensively tour Britain starting on 24 April 1975 as support act to Pilot, who scored a UK #1 hit with "January". Despite all the promotion activity, neither album nor single managed to chart in the UK.

Track listing

2016 bonus tracks
 14. Couldn't Live - 2:23
 15. I Gotta Be Free [Chris Norman - Demo Recording] - 1:30
 16. You Ring My Bell [Kindness] - 2:58

Charts
The album peaked at number 94 for one week in June 1979 in Australia.

Credits

Smokie

Chris Norman – lead vocals and guitar
Terry Uttley – bass and backing vocals
Pete Spencer – drums and vocals
Alan Silson – lead guitar, backing vocals, lead vocal on "A Day at the Mother-in-Law's"

Technical personnel

Produced by Mike Chapman in association with Nicky Chinn for Chinnichap
Engineer – Pete Coleman
Recorded at Audio International Studios in London
Tape operators – Pete Silver and Phil Colman
Mastered by Chris Blair at EMI, Abbey Road
Cover photography – Gered Mankowitz

Remastering
Tim Turan at Turan Audio – 2007 remastering
MM Sound Digital Mastering Studios – 2016 remastering

References

External links
Smokie discography 1975-1982

1975 debut albums
Rak Records albums
Smokie (band) albums
Albums produced by Mike Chapman